Peneus is a river god in Greek mythology.

Peneus or Pineios (Greek: Πηνειός) may also refer to:
Pineios (Thessaly), a river in Thessaly, Greece
Pineios (Peloponnese), a river in Peloponnese, Greece